Randi Heggemsnes Gustad (born 2 May 1977) is a Norwegian team handball player. She played for the club Nordstrand IF and for the Norwegian national team. 

Gustad played 26 matches and scored 47 goals for the Norwegian national handball team between 2004 and 2005. She participated at the 2004 European Women's Handball Championship, where the team won gold medals. She also played at the 2005 World Women's Handball Championship, where the team finished ninth.

Outside of sports, she is a jurist. She lives in Oslo.

Gustad has been board member of the foundation Anti-Doping Norway.

References

External links

1977 births
Living people
Norwegian female handball players
Norwegian women lawyers
21st-century Norwegian lawyers